Sunkoshi Rural Municipality is a rural municipality in Sindhuli district of Bagmati Province in Nepal. The Rural municipality is divided into 7 wards. According to 2011 Nepal census, the total population of the municipality is 21,473 with 4,557 households. The total area of the municipality is   The headquarter of the municipality is at Jhangajholi Ratmata.

The rural municipality was established on March 10, 2017 when Ministry of Federal Affairs and Local Development dissolved the existing village development committees and announced the establishment of this new local body.

Kusheshwar Dumja, Jhangjholi Ratmata, Purano Jhangajholi, Sitalpati and Majhuwa VDCs were merged to form the new rural municipality.

See also
 Bagmati Province

External links
 sunkoshimunsindhuli.gov.np
 Final District 1-75 Corrected Last for RAJPATRA

References

Populated places in Sindhuli District
Rural municipalities in Sindhuli District
Rural municipalities of Nepal established in 2017